Introduction to Metaphysics may refer to:

"Introduction to Metaphysics" (essay), a 1903 essay by Henri Bergson
Introduction to Metaphysics (Heidegger book), a 1953 book by Martin Heidegger